Meruya Selatan (Indonesian for South Meruya) is an administrative village in the Kembangan district, city of West Jakarta, Indonesia. It has postal code of 11650.

See also 

 Kembangan
 List of administrative villages of Jakarta

References 

Districts of Jakarta
West Jakarta